The following is a list of Spanish-language television networks in the United States. As of 2016 the largest Hispanic/Latino television audiences in the U.S. are in California (Los Angeles, Bakersfield, San Diego, Sacramento, San Francisco area), New York (New York City), Washington D.C., Florida (Miami area, Orlando, Tampa/St. Petersburg area), Texas (Houston, Dallas, Ft. Worth, San Antonio, Rio Grande Valley), Illinois (Chicago), Georgia (Atlanta), Pennsylvania (Philadelphia), Colorado (Denver), Utah (Salt Lake City), Ohio (Cleveland, Columbus), Indiana (Indianapolis), Massachusetts (Boston), Connecticut (Hartford), Minnesota (Minneapolis/St. Paul), Wisconsin (Milwaukee), Louisiana (New Orleans), Tennessee (Nashville), North Carolina (Raleigh/Durham), Virginia (Richmond), Nevada (Las Vegas), and Arizona (Phoenix, Tucson).

Major networks

Specialty networks

Defunct networks

See also
 List of Spanish-language newspapers published in the United States
 List of Spanish-language magazines in the United States
 :Category:Spanish-language radio in the United States

References

Bibliography
 
 
 
 
 
 
  (Includes discussion of Spanish language TV)

External links
 Hispanic Television Summit, annual industry conference in USA